Peter Schmidt (September 4, 1892 – January 12, 1979), known professionally as Pete Smith, was an American producer and narrator of short subject films.

A native of New York City, Smith began working as a publicist at Metro-Goldwyn-Mayer during the 1920s. He later became involved with movie making. He is best known for his series of short movies, the Pete Smith Specialties, which were produced from the 1930s to the 1950s. Smith produced and narrated more than 150 short movies which earned him two Best Live Action Short Film Academy Awards. In 1953, he was awarded an Academy Honorary Award for his short subjects.

Smith's later years were spent in a Santa Monica convalescent home due to ill health. In January 1979, Smith jumped to his death from the roof of the home.

Early life and career
Smith was born in New York City. He began his career as an aide for a vaudeville performers union. Smith then worked as an editor and critic for a trade magazine before becoming a press agent. By 1915 he was doing movie publicity for Bosworth, Inc., followed by the Oliver Morosco Photoplay Co., Artcraft Pictures Corporation, and Famous Players-Lasky. He was one of the founding members of the Associated Motion Picture Advertisers.

During 1925, Smith was hired as the manager of publicity for Metro-Goldwyn-Mayer by Louis B. Mayer. He was later recruited to overdub the actions of trained dogs for the studio's Dogville Comedies. Smith would later narrate the studio's sports newsreels; he would embellish the action by running certain scenes in reverse, or adding his own commentary.

Pete Smith Specialties
Both MGM and the movie-going public learned of Smith's flair for comedy, and he was given his own series, Pete Smith Specialties; he produced and narrated 150 short movie subjects for MGM from the 1930s to 1955. His distinctive tenor voice and nasal tone were very recognizable and a trademark of the series.

Most of Smith's movies were comedy documentaries, typically one reel (9 to 11 minutes long). Short-movie subjects in this era were part of the studios' exhibition packages, along with serials, animated cartoons, newsreels, travel documentaries, etc. Among the diverse topics Smith featured by his short movies were Emily Post-style household hints, insect life seen through a microscope, military training and hardware (during World War II), and dancing lessons. There were even several "series-within-the-series", such as general-knowledge quizzes, professional-football news (in the days before widespread television), quirky features concerning different kinds of animals (for example, Donkey Baseball and Social Sea Lions), and "Goofy Movies" (playing antique silent dramas humorously). Smith narrated a patriotic short movie for the U.S. Government, The Tree In a Test Tube (1943), filmed in color, featuring Laurel and Hardy in a demonstration of household wood products, with Smith explaining the various exhibits for the viewer.

During the 1940s, movie stuntman and actor Dave O'Brien became the primary actor of Pete Smith Specialties. The hapless O'Brien would personify everyday nuisances: dealing with pests at the movies, demonstrating pet peeves, tackling hazardous home-improvement projects, and other problems with which the audience could identify. O'Brien's scenes were silent, compelling O'Brien to express his satisfaction or frustration entirely in visual terms as narrator Smith offered commentary. O'Brien knew the format so well that he also directed many of the short movies, using the name "David Barclay." He staged many of the sight gags himself, taking stupendous pratfalls for the camera.

Smith produced and narrated more than 150 short movies which earned him fourteen Academy Award nominations and two Best Live Action Short Film Academy Awards. At the 26th Academy Awards, Smith was awarded an Academy Honorary Award "for his witty and pungent observations on the American scene in his series of Pete Smith Specialties."

Smith announced his retirement in 1954. The MGM unit that produced the Pete Smith Specialties was terminated the next year, a casualty of short movies' decreasing popularity at the time.

Personal life
Smith, under his birth name "Peter J. Schmid," married – on February 6, 1919, in Manhattan – Marjorie Ganss (1893–1958). They had one son, Douglas Mosely Schmid (1919–1984), who later became a technician for RKO. Smith and Ganss remained married until her death in 1958. Smith's second marriage was to his secretary, Anne Dunston, whom he married in Las Vegas in October 1962.

Later years and death

Smith spent his later years in poor health at a convalescent home in Santa Monica, California. On January 12, 1979, Smith committed suicide by leaping off the building's roof. Smith was survived by his second wife, Anne, and his son Douglas.

For his contribution to the movie industry, Pete Smith received a star symbol on the Hollywood Walk of Fame, at 1621 Vine Street.

Selected filmography

Home media availability
Pete Smith’s short films are included as extras on DVDs of many classic Warner Home Video films of the era. These include:

 Menu - Morning Glory (1933)
 Goofy Movies, #1 - Midnight Mary (1933)
 Goofy Movies, #2 - Manhattan Melodrama (1934)
 Goofy Movies, #3 - Evelyn Prentice (1934)
 Goofy Movies, #4 - Sadie McKee (1934)
 Penny Wisdom - The Prisoner of Zenda (1937)
 Romance of Radium - Madame Curie (1943)
 Quicker 'n a Wink - Go West (1940)
 Wedding Bills - Strike Up the Band (1940)
 Flicker Memories - The Big Store (1941)
 How to Hold Your Husband - Back - Babes on Broadway (1941)
 Marines in the Making - Random Harvest (1942)
 Studio Visit - Cabin in the Sky (1943)
 Hollywood Daredevils - Girl Crazy (1943)
 Fala - The President's Dog - Lassie Come Home (1943)
 Seeing Hands - DuBarry Was a Lady (1943)
 Movie Pests - Thirty Seconds Over Tokyo (1944)
 Football Thrills of 1944 - Blu-Ray release of Anchors Aweigh (1945)
 Hollywood Scout - The Clock (1945)
 Sure Cures - Easy to Wed (1946)
 I Love My Husband, But! - Without Reservations (1946)
 Now You See It - This Time for Keeps (1947)
 Fala at Hyde Park - Hills of Home (1948)
 You Can't Win! - The Pirate (1948)
 Let's Cogitate! - Battleground (1949)
 Those Good Old Days - Madame Bovary (1949)
 Water Trix - Neptune's Daughter (1949)
 Sports Oddities - That Midnight Kiss (1949)
 Pest Control - The Stratton Story (1949)
 Crashing the Movies - Two Weeks with Love (1950)
 Did'ja Know? - Summer Stock (1950)
 Wrong Way Butch - Nancy Goes to Rio (1950)
 Curious Contests - Pagan Love Song (1950)
 Musiquiz - The Belle of New York (1952)
 Reducing - Million Dollar Mermaid (1952)
 This is a Living? - Dangerous When Wet (1953)
 Things We Can Do Without - The Naked Spur (1953)
 Ain't It Aggravatin'? - The Long, Long Trailer (1954)
 Out for Fun - Executive Suite (1954)
 The Fall Guy - Hit the Deck'' (1955)

References

External links 
 
 

1892 births
1979 suicides
20th-century American male actors
Academy Honorary Award recipients
Film producers from California
American public relations people
American male screenwriters
American male voice actors
Male actors from New York City
Male actors from Santa Monica, California
Suicides by jumping in California
Writers from Santa Monica, California
Film directors from New York City
Film directors from California
Screenwriters from California
Screenwriters from New York (state)
Film producers from New York (state)
20th-century American male writers
20th-century American screenwriters
1979 deaths